Bandon Hill Cemetery is a cemetery in Wallington, south-west London. While it was founded in 1900 by the Croydon Rural District Council, it is actually located in the London Borough of Sutton and upon the formation of London Boroughs in 1965, was jointly run by the London Boroughs of Croydon and Sutton. It has an area of about 15 acres, (6¼ hectares) and contains about 14,000 grave spaces.

History
The cemetery's first interment occurred on Wednesday, 7 March 1900. On Friday, 24 March 2006 the cemetery carried out its 30,000th interment.

Notable interments
 Samuel Coleridge-Taylor, English composer who achieved such success that he was once called the "African Mahler"
 Eugene Stratton, American-born dancer and singer, whose career was mostly spent in British music halls
 Joe Elvin, Cockney comedian and music hall entertainer and a Founder of the Grand Order of Water Rats, a show business charity
 Jack Lotto, music hall performer of the late Victorian and Edwardian eras whose specialty was a trick-cycling act
The Cemetery also contains the war graves of 124 Commonwealth service personnel of both World Wars

References

External links
 

Cemeteries in London
1900 establishments in England